Pedro de la Peña, O.P. (died 7 March 1583) was a Roman Catholic prelate who served as the second Bishop of Quito (1565–1583) and the second Bishop of Verapaz (1564–1565).

Biography
Antonio de Hervias was ordained a priest in the Order of Preachers. On 1 Mar 1564, he was selected by the King of Spain and confirmed by Pope Pius IV as Bishop of Verapaz. On 15 May 1565, he was selected by the King of Spain and confirmed by Pope Pius IV as Bishop of Quito.  On 18 October 1565, he was consecrated bishop by Gaspar Zúñiga Avellaneda, Archbishop of Santiago de Compostela with Diego de Covarrubias y Leiva, Bishop of Segovia, and Melchor Alvarez de Vozmediano, Bishop of Guadix, serving as co-consecrators. He served as Bishop of Quito until his death on 7 March 1583.

While bishop, he was the principal co-consecrator of Antonio Avendaño y Paz, Bishop of Concepción (1567).

References

External links and additional sources
 (for Chronology of Bishops) 
 (for Chronology of Bishops) 
 (for Chronology of Bishops) 
 (for Chronology of Bishops) 

1583 deaths
16th-century Roman Catholic bishops in Guatemala
Bishops appointed by Pope Pius IV
Dominican bishops
16th-century Roman Catholic bishops in Ecuador
Roman Catholic bishops of Verapaz
Roman Catholic bishops of Quito